Studio Movie Grill is an American dine-in movie theater chain based in Dallas, Texas. The company's theaters feature a bar and lounge area, with meals that are served in the lounge area or at the theater seat before and during the movie.

History 
Studio Movie Grill was founded in 1993 by Brian Schultz, who served as its CEO for twenty-seven years, until April, 2021. 

The company originated with the opening of the Granada Prestonwood in Addison, Texas, which featured five screens with private luxury boxes and valet parking. The concept evolved into the Studio Movie Grill chain. , Studio Movie Grill has locations in 10 states consisting of over 300 screens.

In October 2020, Studio Movie Grill filed for chapter 11 bankruptcy protection. The company's cash reserves are low due to losses caused by the COVID-19 pandemic. In April 2021, the company announced that they had emerged from bankruptcy. Longtime CFO and COO Ted Croft also became the chain's new CEO after navigating Studio Movie Grill through the pandemic, in which many of its locations stayed open for food delivery orders, and securing funding in a new equity deal.

Corporate affairs
The headquarters were previously in a  area in another building, but moved in 2016.

References

External links
Official website

Movie theatre chains in the United States
Entertainment companies established in 1993
Companies based in Dallas
Entertainment companies of the United States
Companies that filed for Chapter 11 bankruptcy in 2020